Hello Beautiful is a Canadian band from Whitby. They are known primarily for their hybrid sound of pop-rock and hip hop. They were formed by vocalist/guitarist Cole Kidd and drummer Kevin Walsh, who were later joined by vocalist Charlie Royal.

In 2008, the band had two songs, "Virginia Symphony" and "Saint Andrew's Bridge", in the top 5 of MuchMusic, and performed on MTV and Breakfast Television. They also toured with Hedley, Snoop Dogg, illScarlett, Akon, Alexisonfire, and Down with Webster.

Soundtrack for Scenario
In late April 2007, Hello Beautiful recorded their full-length debut, Soundtrack for Scenario, with the help of Canadian music industry veteran Murray Daigle. The album was subsequently released a year later through a distribution deal with the independent label Bent Penny Records via the distribution company, Fontana North. Two singles were released from Soundtrack for Scenario, "Virginia Symphony", and "Saint Andrew's Bridge". Due to large fan support via request lines and internet media, the first single, "Virginia Symphony", was in heavy rotation on MuchMusic for the summer/early fall of 2008, and peaked at No. 2 on Much On Demand's Daily Top 10. Their second video, "Saint Andrew's Bridge", peaked at No. 5. Hello Beautiful was the only unsigned artist to chart that year, while all other charting artists were affiliated with a major and/or major independent label.

Toronto's Exclaim! magazine said of the band: "Their set caused a dance floor eruption and a constant interchange between the crowd and band made for an endearing set. HB got enough love from the crowd to play an encore and left the stage while the  raged." (Recently Reviewed, Exclaim!, Nov/08).

Soundtrack for Scenario also received praise. "Sheer noise can result from fusing Hip Hop, Rock and Punk instead of a euphonic harmony" however, "Hello Beautiful have managed to successfully mix the three types of music into one" (ChartAttack.com Aug/08).

I Wanna Die Like This!
In Winter 2009/10, Hello Beautiful recorded an album titled I Wanna Die Like This! at Vespa Studio. It was produced by Harry Hess and Eric Ratz. Tracks include "Black & White", "Tick Tock", "Heart Beats" and "Some Days", which received radio airplay and garnered significant attention. The album is more rock based, but also has some piano-driven songs, which differs from the last album's base of blues and funk.

Members
 Cole Kidd – rhythm guitar, lead vocals
 Charlie Royal – lead vocals
 Kevin Walsh – drums, backing vocals
 Steven Parker – bass guitar, piano, backing vocals
 Adam Till – lead guitar, backing vocals

Prior Members

 Dan Bradimore – bass guitar, keyboard/piano, backing vocals
 Darrell Wallace – lead guitar
 Buddy Taylor – lead guitar, lead chicks

Discography
EPs
 Soundtrack for Scenario (2008)
 I Wanna Die Like This! (2010)

References

External links

Musical groups established in 2004
Musical groups from the Regional Municipality of Durham
Whitby, Ontario
Canadian alternative rock groups
2004 establishments in Ontario